Lanier is a surname. Notable people with the name include:

 Alex Lanier (born 2005), French badminton player
 Allen Lanier (1946–2013), American musician, original member of the band Blue Öyster Cult
 Anthony Lanier (born 1993), American football player
 Aubrey Lanier (1888–1936), American college football player
 Bob Lanier (politician) (1925–2014), American politician
 Bob Lanier (1948–2022), American basketball player and coach
 Carlotta Walls LaNier (born 1942), one of nine African American students who integrated Little Rock Central High School in 1957
 Cathy Lanier (born 1967), Chief of Police, Washington, D.C.
 Charles D. Lanier (1837–1926), American banker and railroad executive
 Chloe Lanier (21st century), American actress
 Clement Lanier (died 1661), English musician
 Don Lanier (1936–2014), American songwriter and composer
 Emilia Lanier (1569–1645), English poet
 Farris Lanier Jr. (1949–2019), American R&B-funk singer, member of Lanier & Co.
 Hal Lanier (born 1942), American baseball player and manager
 J. Hicks Lanier (born c.1941), American businessman
 James Lanier (1800–1881), American financier
 James F. D. Lanier (1858–1928), American banker and sportsman
 Jaron Lanier (born 1960), American virtual reality developer
 Jerome Lanier (died 1659), English musician
 Jerry P. Lanier (born 1952), American diplomat
 Sir John Lanier (died 1692), British Army general
 Kate Lanier, American screenwriter
 Ken Lanier (born 1959), American football player
 Khalia Lanier (born 1998), American volleyball player
 Lee Lanier, American computer animator
 Lyle H. Lanier (1903–1988), American psychologist, academic
 Mark Lanier (born 1960), American lawyer and teacher
 Max Lanier (1915–2007), American baseball player
 Nicholas Lanier the Elder (died 1612), French court musician
 Nicholas Lanier (1588–1666), English composer, singer, lutenist and painter
 Rob Lanier (born 1968), American college basketball coach
 Randy Lanier (born 1954), American racing car driver
 Raphael Lanier (1900–1962), American diplomat
 Sartain Lanier (1909–1994), American businessman and philanthropist
 Sidney Lanier (1842–1881), American musician and poet
 Sterling E. Lanier (1927–2007), American science fiction writer and editor
 Susan Lanier (born 1947), American actress
 Thomas C. Lanier (19th century), Alabama planter and Confederate soldier
 Virginia Lanier (1930–2003), American mystery fiction writer
 William Henry Lanier (1855–1929), American educator
 Willie Lanier (born 1945), American football player